Cardinal Mooney High School was a coeducational Roman Catholic high school in Greece, New York, a suburb of Rochester, New York. Named for Edward Mooney, a bishop of the Diocese of Rochester who later became a cardinal, it was opened in 1962, staffed by the Brothers of Holy Cross and the Sisters of Mercy.

In 1989, with enrollment declining and other financial difficulties, the Brothers and the diocese decided to close the school at the end of the 1988–89 school year. The school building and property were sold to the Greece Central School District, and was reopened in 1990 as Apollo Middle School. In 2014 Apollo Middle School also closed and the school was reopened under the name Odyssey Academy.

References

Defunct Catholic secondary schools in New York (state)
Educational institutions established in 1962
Educational institutions disestablished in 1989
Defunct schools in New York (state)
1962 establishments in New York (state)
1989 disestablishments in New York (state)